Prakash Nanjappa (born 29 February 1976) is an Indian shooter who competes in the 10 metre air pistol and 50 metre pistol events. He was the only Indian to win a medal in the 2013 ISSF World Cup, when he won bronze with a very minor difference between the second place in 10 metre air pistol event in Changwon, South Korea. In the same event, he won the silver medal at the 2014 Commonwealth Games in Glasgow.

Early life
Prakash Nanjappa was born on 29 February 1976 in Bangalore to P. N. Papanna, a national-level shooter. He started shooting in 1999, though motorbike rallies was his primary interest. In 2003, he moved to Canada and worked as a software engineer till 2009, when, on his father's insistence, he quit the job and moved back to India and took up the sport again.

Career
Nanjappa won a bronze medal in the 2013 ISSF World Cup in Changwon, South Korea, in the 10 metre air pistol event having scored 180.2 points in the final. In the same year, he suffered from a paralytic attack in the right side of his face, during the World Cup in Granada. Following his recovery, in October 2013, Nanjappa won the silver medal in the 50 metre pistol event in the Asian air gun championship in Tehran.

In the 2014 Commonwealth Games in Glasgow, Nanjappa won the silver medal in the 10 m air pistol event, having scored 198.2 points in the final. Earlier, he had topped the qualification round by scoring 580 points.

Nanjappa qualified for the 2016 Rio Olympics in Men's 50 metres Pistol event, where he finished 25th in the qualification round.

References

External links
 
 Prakash Nanjappa profile at ISSF

Living people
1976 births
Indian male sport shooters
ISSF pistol shooters
Sportspeople from Bangalore
Commonwealth Games silver medallists for India
Asian Games medalists in shooting
Shooters at the 2014 Asian Games
Asian Games bronze medalists for India
Olympic shooters of India
Shooters at the 2016 Summer Olympics
Commonwealth Games medallists in shooting
Medalists at the 2014 Asian Games
Sport shooters from Karnataka
Shooters at the 2014 Commonwealth Games
Recipients of the Arjuna Award
21st-century Indian people
Medallists at the 2014 Commonwealth Games